Norton (South Yorkshire) railway station was a railway station to serve Norton, South Yorkshire, England. It was built by the Wakefield, Pontefract and Goole Railway company on their line between Doncaster and Knottingley. The line and its stations were absorbed into the Lancashire and Yorkshire Railway in 1847 when that company changed its name from the Manchester and Leeds Railway.

The station buildings were similar to those at Womersley and were described as "Swiss Cottage" style. They are a stone built construction with a clipped gable end.

At the grouping it passed to the LMS and British Railways on nationalisation.  The station closed to passengers on 27 September 1948. But the railway line is still open and now carries freight trains (mainly bulk coal) to and from the power stations at Drax, Ferrybridge & Eggborough, along with Grand Central's passenger services between Bradford Interchange and London Kings Cross since 2010.

As part of a report to Doncaster Borough Council in September 2008 the station site was to be protected for future use in a strategy for the railways in the borough, reopening being a distant possibility.

References

Disused railway stations in Doncaster
Former Lancashire and Yorkshire Railway stations
Railway stations in Great Britain opened in 1848
Railway stations in Great Britain closed in 1948
Norton, Doncaster